Molavi Ahmad Narouie (1963 — 18 March 2014; in Persian:  مولوی احمد نارویی) was a notable Iranian Sunni theologian, human rights activist, journalist and a vice president of Zahedan seminary.

He was a prominent Sunni theologian and expert on Islamic jurisprudence. Ahmad Narouie is also a social and human rights activist in Sistan and Baluchistan Province.

See also
Islam in Iran
Molavi Abdul Hamid

References 

Iranian Islamic religious leaders
People from Zahedan
Iranian Sunni Muslims
Sunni Muslim scholars of Islam
1963 births
2014 deaths
Deobandis